Kamazan-e Vosta Rural District is a rural district (dehestan) in Zand District, Malayer County, Hamadan Province, Iran. At the 2006 census, its population was 4,163, in 1,083 families. The rural district has 10 villages.

References 

Rural Districts of Hamadan Province
Malayer County